Racławice  is a village in the administrative district of Gmina Nisko, within Nisko County, Subcarpathian Voivodeship, in south-eastern Poland.

Notable people
Antoni Dyboski (1853-1917), a Polish lawyer and activist

References

Villages in Nisko County